was the second station on the Ōsaka Kaidō (or fifty-fifth of the fifty-seven stations of the Tōkaidō). It is located in the southern part of Fushimi-ku in the present-day city of Kyoto, Kyoto Prefecture, Japan.

History
Located between the Yodo and Katsura rivers, Yodo-juku was founded in 1619. During the Edo period, it was part of the castle town that surrounded Yodo Castle, which was constructed in 1623.

Neighboring post towns
Ōsaka Kaidō (extended Tōkaidō)
Fushimi-juku – Yodo-juku – Hirakata-juku

References

Stations of the Tōkaidō
History of Kyoto Prefecture